Atormentada, is a Mexican telenovela produced by Televisa and originally transmitted by Telesistema Mexicano.

Cast 
Patricia Morán
Maruja Grifell
Enrique Aguilar
Antonio Medellín

References

External links 

Mexican telenovelas
Televisa telenovelas
Spanish-language telenovelas
1967 telenovelas
1967 Mexican television series debuts
1967 Mexican television series endings